Samuel Tilden Ansell (January 1, 1875 – May 27, 1954) was an  American Brigadier general active during World War I.

Early life 

Ansell was born in Coinjock, North Carolina. He graduated number thirty-one of seventy-two from the United States Military Academy at West Point in 1899.

Career 
Ansell was commissioned to the 11th Infantry and later transferred to the Judge Advocate General's Department. From 1902 to 1904 and again from 1906 to 1910, he was an instructor of law at the United States Military Academy.

He received a Bachelor of Laws from the University of North Carolina in 1904 and became a prosecuting attorney. Ansell was part of the civil government of the Philippines and during World War I he became acting Judge Advocate General of the army. He started the movement to reform the court-martial system and to rewrite the Articles of War.

Ansell was promoted to brigadier general on October 5, 1917.  He resigned from the military to resume his law practice on July 21, 1919.

Some of the military justice reforms Ansell lobbied for were included in the National Defense Act of 1920.

Awards
For his service as acting judge advocate, Ansell received the Army Distinguished Service Medal, the citation for which reads:

Death and legacy
Samuel Tilden Ansell contracted cancer and died at his home in the Adams Morgan section of Washington, D.C. at the age of seventy-nine on May 27, 1954. He was buried at the West Point Cemetery on June 2, 1954.

References

1875 births
1954 deaths
People from Currituck County, North Carolina
United States Military Academy alumni
Military personnel from North Carolina
University of North Carolina School of Law alumni
United States Military Academy faculty
United States Army generals of World War I
Recipients of the Distinguished Service Medal (US Army)
United States Army generals
Lawyers from Washington, D.C.
Deaths from cancer in Washington, D.C.
Burials at West Point Cemetery